This is the results breakdown of the local elections held in the Canary Islands on 26 May 2019. The following tables show detailed results in the autonomous community's most populous municipalities, sorted alphabetically.

Opinion polls

City control
The following table lists party control in the most populous municipalities, including provincial capitals (shown in bold). Gains for a party are displayed with the cell's background shaded in that party's colour.

Municipalities

Arona
Population: 79,448

Las Palmas de Gran Canaria
Population: 378,517

San Cristóbal de La Laguna
Population: 155,549

Santa Cruz de Tenerife
Population: 204,856

Telde
Population: 102,424

Island Cabildos

See also
2019 Canarian regional election

References

Canary Islands
2019